Cambridge can refer to three cities:

 Cambridge, Cambridgeshire, England
 Cambridge, Ontario, Canada
 Cambridge, Massachusetts, United States

City of Cambridge can refer to:
 City of Cambridge Rowing Club, a rowing club based in Cambridge, England

See also
 Town of Cambridge
 Cambridge (disambiguation)